Dear Diz (Every Day I Think of You) is an album by Cuban jazz trumpeter Arturo Sandoval that won the Grammy Award for Best Large Jazz Ensemble Album in 2013. The album is Sandoval's tribute to his friend, Dizzy Gillespie. Musicians on the album include Gary Burton, Eddie Daniels, Joey DeFrancesco, and Bob Mintzer.

Track listing

Personnel
 Arturo Sandoval – trumpet
 Bruce Otto, Craig Gosnell, Steve Holtman, Wayne Bergeron – trumpet, flugelhorn
 Rusty Higgins – alto saxophone, alto flute
 Dan Higgins – alto saxophone, alto flute,  flute, piccolo flute
 Rob Lockart – tenor saxophone, clarinet
 Brian Scanlon– tenor saxophone, clarinet
 Bob Sheppard – tenor saxophone, clarinet
 Bob Mintzer – tenor saxophone
 Greg Huckins – baritone saxophone, bass clarinet
 Gary Burton – vibraphone
 Joey DeFrancesco – organ
 Shelly Berg – piano
 Carlitos Del Puerto – bass
 Chuck Berghofer – bass
 Brian Nova – guitar
 Dustin Higgins – guitar
 Gregg Field – drums
 Joey De Leon – percussion
 Munyungo Jackson – percussion
 Andy García – bongos

Production
 Arturo Sandoval – producer
 Gregg Field – producer, recording
 John Burk – executive producer
 Don Murray – recording, mixing
 Andrew Click, Bill Smith, Dustin Higgins, Eddie Perez, Gerrit Kinkel, Steve Genewick – engineer
 Chad Carlisle, Gerrit Kinkel – assistant engineer
 Paul Blakemore – mastering

Charts

References

2012 albums
Arturo Sandoval albums
Big band albums
Concord Music Group albums
Grammy Award for Best Large Jazz Ensemble Album
Latin Grammy Award for Best Latin Jazz Album